Pinckney Corners Cemetery is a historic cemetery located near Copenhagen in Lewis County, New York.  It was established in 1810.  It contains approximately 240 marked burials dating from 1810 to 1901.  It is the final resting place of many early settlers of the region.  Those buried include veterans of the Revolutionary War and the War of 1812.

It was listed on the National Register of Historic Places in 2014.

References

External links
 

Cemeteries on the National Register of Historic Places in New York (state)
1810 establishments in New York (state)
Buildings and structures in Lewis County, New York
National Register of Historic Places in Lewis County, New York